Sheppey (1933) was William Somerset Maugham's last play, written at the age of 59 and after he had reached distinction as a novelist and playwright. Maugham dedicated the book to Sir John Gielgud.

It is the story about the change of fortune of hairdresser Joseph Miller who was born on the Isle of Sheppey, Kent and nicknamed Sheppey. The play is set in the 1930s. Sheppey, a hard worker at the same establishment for 15 years, wins a subsidiary prize in the Irish Lottery of £8,500 but does not take to his win with the same style that most others would – and to which most, including his boss, his wife or his daughter and her fiancé (a teacher given to believing that he is more educated than most) — expect him to.

The play was written in 1932 and first produced at the Wyndham's Theatre London on 14 September 1933 with a cast that included Ralph Richardson, then aged 31, and Laura Cowie who had been a star of the silent movies.

After the production of Sheppey, Maugham announced publicly that he would write no more plays and kept to his word until his death in 1965. He did, however, write numerous other short stories, novels, articles and other items.

Outline of the plot

Sheppey is the story of a hardworking hairdresser who generally considers himself to be a lucky man and then has that self-belief proved when he wins a considerable sum of money.

Maugham with ease develops an ever-enlarging deterministic plot that commences with the causal effect of Sheppey's win and then progresses that effect upon the way that it is believed that it will influence all of the near and not so near others in his life. Those people, family, workmates and even street acquaintances become entwined in the ripple effect of the win to the point where they believe they will also benefit by Sheppey's good fortune.

As the play progresses the reader is faced therefore with the suspense of the outcome: which is either to agree with Sheppey’s view as to what to do with the money or agree with those that think his proposed actions are "potty".

The reader learns at the closest levels that Sheppey’s wife, Mrs Miller, believes she will benefit from the assistance of a charwoman to do the rough work of washing etc. as she approaches her later years. Florrie, his daughter, is able and does quit her work in the city so that she can speed up the proposed marriage date to her somewhat precocious sweetheart Ernie.

A little further away, Sheppey’s employer Mr Bradley believes that Sheppey will now be happy to buy into his hairdressing salon and become an equal partner and in that way he will not lose the good effect of Sheppey’s consideration towards their customers.

Ernie, the future son-in-law, upon learning that Sheppey is to be lifted from the status of a mere labourer, feels this will change the appearance of the girl he is about to marry and thereby allow him to stand for parliament and who knows, maybe become Prime Minister of the United Kingdom one day.

In the background Sheppey, somewhat taken aback by his win, and overcome by the thought of what to do with the money, decides against his previous suggestion of buying some land overlooking the sea on the Isle of Sheppey and proposes another outlandish idea. That idea revolves around the fact that he is fresh from recently having attended the local court as a witness to a theft and that during that attendance he found that the thief and others up on similar charges were no different from the rest of the people in his society. Sheppey enriches his belief that such people only require a helping hand and they will take the better option of not thieving etc.

Spurred by this growing belief and also because of (unknown to Sheppey) a physical or mental ailment that we learn more about as the story progresses, Sheppey decides instead to walk in the footsteps of Jesus and to give the money away. This thought only occurs following the effect of his receiving from his wife, whilst he is recuperating, a bible to read. Reading that Jesus would give away his goods to the poor and urged others to do so, Sheppey decides to do likewise and sets about to bring hope and charity to those in the street.

He begins to give to the poor ‘willy nilly, he takes a street prostitute on hard times into his house, and he welcomes also to his home the very thief that he had previously charged for theft.
It is at this point that Maugham twists us around his literary finger, something that he does so well in many of his other books.

First the thief and the prostitute leave the safety of free food and lodging. They indicate that they prefer to thieve and to solicit and so they leave to go on these activities. Readers are pulled towards the views of the family at the expense of Sheppey.

Then his family concoct a plan to have him seen to by an eminent psychiatrist in the hope that he is found 'potty' and can not give their money away. The psychiatrist finding someone doing the unusual, diagnoses as would be expected and agrees that Sheppey is indeed potty. Readers are now pulled in the other direction preferring to again agree with the man who wishes only to do good for the world.
Finally Maugham reminds us all that fate will take what fate will have.

Maugham who with his tremendous skill of only using exactly the number of words that are required takes an old Arabic fable and in the simplest form, ties together the basic elements of setting, plot, characters, and theme and ends the play with Death visiting Sheppey. After all Maugham reminds us, whatever good or bad fortune enters our life, in the end we can not escape some aspects of our fate. Then to clearly entrench the view in readers minds, and just before Sheppey dies, he says to Death:"I wish now I’d gone down to the Isle of Sheppey when the doctor advised it.  You wouldn’t ‘ave thought of looking for me there."

Death replies:
"There was a merchant in Baghdad who sent his servant to market to buy provisions and in a little while the servant came back, white and trembling, and said, Master, just now when I was in the marketplace I was jostled by a woman in the crowd and when I turned I saw it was Death that jostled me. She looked at me and made a threatening gesture; now, lend me your horse, and I will ride away from this city and avoid my fate. I will go to Samarra and there Death will not find me. The merchant lent him his horse, and the servant mounted it, and he dug his spurs in its flanks and as fast as the horse could gallop he went. Then the merchant went down to the market-place and he saw me standing in the crowd and he came to me and said, Why did you make a threatening gesture to my servant when you saw him this morning? That was not a threatening gesture, I said, it was only a start of surprise. I was astonished to see him in Baghdad, for I had an appointment with him tonight in Samarra."

Influence of the play on other writers

John O'Hara was prompted by Maugham's Sheppey inclusion of the scene with Death to title his influential book Appointment in Samarra. He directly acknowledges Maugham in the foreword to the 1952 edition of his book.

Jeffrey Archer in his book To Cut a Long Story Short includes the Maugham version word for word. His preface to the book directly credits John O'Hara and Somerset Maugham as the source for this version, although he is aware that the story is much older, deriving from ancient Middle Eastern sources.

At one point in Peter Bogdanovich's 1968 film Targets, Boris Karloff's character recites Maugham's version of the story almost word for word (describing Death in the third person, but including the same details of the servant's flight).

A modified version of the story is told in "The Six Thatchers" (2017), the first episode of the fourth series of the British television programme Sherlock.  The servant is absent from the tale; it is instead the merchant who has the nighttime appointment with Death in Samarra after being startled to see Death that morning in the Baghdad market.

1933 plays
Plays by W. Somerset Maugham
Kent in fiction
Isle of Sheppey
Fiction about personifications of death
West End plays